Dee Davis Oberwetter (born 1959) is an American author of romantic suspense and time-travel novels. She served as the president of Romance Writers of America's Board of Directors from 2017 to 2018.

Biography

Author Dee Davis was born in Oklahoma in 1959 and spent her childhood moving around the southwest. After high school, she attended Hendrix College, where she received her BA in Political Science and History and followed that with an master's degree in Public Administration. Davis worked in public relations for ten years until the birth of her daughter. In 2000, her first novel Everything in its Time was published and Davis has consistently written novels since.

Dee Davis served on the Romance Writers of America Board of Directors from 2013 to 2018 as Director-at-Large and later as President of the Board.

Bibliography

Time travel romances

Time After Time Series

Romantic suspense

Random Heroes Collection

Liars Game

Last Chance

A-Tac Series

Triad Series

Rising Storm
Alongside Julie Kenner, Dee Davis led the multi-author series Rising Storm. Davis wrote two of the titles herself.

Women's fiction

Anthologies

Davis has also had her works appear in a number of anthologies.

  With Julie Kenner and Kathleen O'Reilly
 With Julie Kenner and Kathleen O'Reilly

References and sources

Dee Davis' Official website

External links

Living people
1959 births
Writers from Oklahoma
Date of birth missing (living people)
American romantic fiction novelists
21st-century American novelists
American women novelists
21st-century American women writers